Sammy Labella (June 6, 1929 – September 22, 2014), better known by his stage name Skip E. Lowe, was an American stand-up comedian, talk show host and actor.

Career
Prior to adopting his now familiar stage name, LaBella worked as a stand-up comic, impressionist and m.c. As early as 1958, he performed in a number of Pittsburgh venues, most notably Lenny Litman's Copa, where he opened for Lambert, Hendricks and Ross and Dakota Staton. The following summer saw a number of engagements in New York State, and it was in July 1959 that LaBella made his first appearance as Skip E. Lowe, at Glen Casino in Williamsville.

Beginning in 1978, he hosted Skip E. Lowe Looks at Hollywood, a weekly talk show for public-access cable television that aired in Los Angeles and New York City.

He appeared in the films Black Shampoo (1976), The World's Greatest Lover (1977), Cameron's Closet (1988), and A-List (2006).  In 2001, Lowe authored The Boy With the Betty Grable Legs: A Showbiz Memoir.

Martin Short cited him as the inspiration for his character Jiminy Glick.

It is estimated that Lowe conducted some 6,000 cable-television interviews from 1978 to 2014.

He was openly gay.

Death
Lowe died in Los Angeles, at age 85, on September 22, 2014, from emphysema.

According to his former website, Lowe was cremated and had his ashes scattered at Ventura Pier on November 23, 2014.

Filmography

See also

 List of people from Los Angeles
 List of people from Mississippi
 List of talk show hosts

References

Further reading

External links
 

1929 births
2014 deaths
20th-century American male actors
21st-century American male actors
American male film actors
American public access television personalities
American stand-up comedians
American television talk show hosts
Comedians from Mississippi
Deaths from emphysema
People from Greenville, Mississippi
Male actors from Los Angeles
Male actors from Mississippi
Television personalities from California
LGBT people from Mississippi
LGBT people from California
American gay actors